Fox Movies  is an international movie channel owned by Fox Networks Group, a part of Walt Disney Direct-to-Consumer & International. The channel was launched on February 8, 2007.

History
fXM: Movies from Fox channel in the US was renamed to Fox Movie Channel on March 1, 2000 until September 2013 when the channel changed its name back to FXM.

In 2008, Fox Movies was launched by Fox International Channels and Rotana Media Services along with Fox Series channels in the Middle East market. Fox then purchased a stake in Rotana, while the joint venture agreed with Disney to carry Disney and American Broadcasting Company content on the two channels for four years. In early March 2010, Fox International Channels agreed to move its Middle East and North Africa market channels' operations from Hong Kong and other locations to an Abu Dhabi facility. On 1 July 2011, Fox Movies was made available in Portugal on pay services and Angola and Mozambique on free-to-air.

On July 1, 2011, Fox Movies was launched by Fox International Channels Portugal with airing many genres including drama, comedy, science fiction, action and horror with programming during the summer slate included hits such as X-Men and The Queen.

On January 1, 2012, Star Movies was rebranded to Fox Movies Premium and FOX Movies Premium HD, available in Hong Kong and selected Southeast Asian countries. In India, China, Middle East and North Africa, Taiwan and the Philippines (SD only), the Star Movies brand remained until July 2017 when was rebranded to Fox Movies.

On October 2, 2012, Fox International Channels would launch another Fox Movies with being available to Albania, Bosnia and Herzegovina, Bulgaria, Croatia, Macedonia, Montenegro, Serbia, Slovenia and Kosovo regions.

Market channels

References

External links
 Official Site

Fox Networks Group
 
Disney television networks
Movie channels
Television channels and stations established in 2007